The PinePhone is a smartphone developed by Hong Kong-based computer manufacturer Pine64, intended to allow the user to have full control over the device. Measures to ensure this are: running mainline Linux-based mobile operating systems, assembling the phone with screws, simplifying the disassembly for repairs and upgrades. LTE, GPS, WiFi, BlueTooth and both cameras can be physically switched off. The PinePhone ships with the Manjaro Linux-based operating system using the Plasma Mobile graphic interface, although other distributions can be installed by users.

History and editions
Pine64 sold limited editions of the PinePhone marketed towards developers and early adopters. The phone shipped worldwide with few geographical restrictions. The "Braveheart" edition, shipped in January 2020, was the first publicly available version of the phone, providing only a test firmware so the user could test their phone before installing their operating system of choice.

In 2019, Pine64 partnered with existing and well established Linux-on-phone projects to launch a "Community Edition" campaign to incentivize software development for the device. Through this partnership, Pine64 donated $10 for each unit sold to the project maintainers. The community edition PinePhones featured a branding on the back cover and shipped with a custom box designed by the partnered artists. The "Mobian" community edition in February 2021 was the last to be offered.

Initially the PinePhone was only available in one hardware configuration. The enhanced "Convergence Package" was introduced with the postmarketOS community edition announcement, featuring increased RAM, additional eMMC storage, and a USB-C dock known as a "docking bar". The docking bar is capable of delivering power to the phone via USB-C power-in (3A 5V), outputting digital video via HDMI, and has 10/100Mbps Ethernet connectivity and two USB 2.0 ports (for e.g. external storage, mouse and keyboard).

In February 2021, Pine64 announced the end of community edition devices, and that the default operating system for the production-ready PinePhone would be Manjaro using the KDE Plasma Mobile graphical environment. The company then introduced the PinePhone Beta Edition several weeks later. The Beta Edition's hardware and pricing was confirmed to be the same as the previous three community edition production runs, and the "Beta" was a reference to the software only. Pine64 began pre-orders on March 24, 2021, and began shipping Beta Edition devices in late April.

In October 2021, Pine64 announced the PinePhone Pro. In January 2022, Pine64 started accepting pre-orders of PinePhone Pro for deliveries by February 2022.

Features and comparisons
The PinePhone is often compared to other phones shipping with non-Android Linux distributions, especially the Librem 5, which released around the same time, and the WiFi-VoIP phone Necuno, which does not employ a cellular modem.

Pine64 promises five years of production. The long production life and sharing a common A64 platform with the PineTab tablet and Pine A64 boards is meant to encourage tinkerers to create mods and DIY projects based on the PinePhone.

Hardware

The original PinePhone used an Allwinner A64 processor, which has four Cortex-A53 cores clocked at 1.152 GHz and a Mali-400 MP2 GPU. Its frame and case cover is made of plastic. It has a 5-megapixel back camera and a 2-megapixel front camera, and a USB-C port with USB 2.0 that supports DisplayPort alt-mode. Its 3000mAh battery supports 15W fast charging and is easily replaced without tools. It uses the same form factor as a Galaxy J7 battery to make it easier to find replacement batteries. Linux distributions configure its LPDDR3 DRAM at clock rates that vary between 552 and 624 MHz.

Like the Librem 5, the PinePhone uses separate cellular baseband and WiFi/Bluetooth chips. Together with the hardware kill switches, this results in larger printed circuit boards (PCBs) and less energy efficiency compared to the mass-produced Android phone that has an integrated System on a Chip, such as the Snapdragon, Helio or Exynos. The PinePhone is thinner at 9.2 mm than the Librem 5 which is 15.5 mm thick, because the PinePhone solders its wireless communication chips to the PCB whereas the Librem 5 places the cellular baseband and WiFi/Bluetooth on two removable M.2 cards.

Pine64 is the second phone maker (after OpenMoko) to offer booting from a microSD card, which allows users to try out one or more operating systems before installing in the internal flash memory.

Another distinctive feature of the PinePhone is the I2C connector under the back cover, which can be used for adding mods to the phone. In 2019 and 2020, Pine64 stated that it was developing four mods: a Psion Series 5-inspired physical keyboard, a 5000mAh battery, wireless charging and a fingerprint sensor.

The PinePhone has six DIP switches under the back cover, the first five of which switch off separately the cellular modem, the WiFi/Bluetooth module, the microphone, the rear camera, and the front camera.  The sixth DIP switch will convert the 3.5 mm headphone jack into a UART serial port, which is the first time this kind of switch has been included in a mobile phone.

Circuit schematics of the PinePhone are available.

Software

The PinePhone aims to be fully open source in its drivers and bootloader. Despite this, due to the scarcity of open source components for cellular and wireless connectivity, the firmware for the Realtek RTL8723CS WiFi/Bluetooth, as well as the optional auto-focus firmware for the OmniVision OV5640 back camera, remain proprietary software. In order to mitigate potential threats to privacy, these components communicate with the rest of the system only over serial protocols, such as USB 2.0, I2S and SDIO, which do not allow direct memory access (DMA). Use of these protocols also permits them to be physically disconnected via kill switches.

In late 2020, Pine64 started an incentive called the Nutcracker Challenge, in order to encourage the development of open-source wireless networking on the BL602 WiFi and Bluetooth board. Some distributions support the use of USB Wi-Fi adapters that use open-source wireless firmware. Modem firmware of the Quectel EG25-G LTE board is based on a proprietary Android userspace, though an unofficial, mostly open-source version exists, replacing most proprietary components, except for the baseband firmware and the TrustZone kernel, which is signed by Qualcomm.

Operating systems
 
The PinePhone relies completely on open-source operating systems developed by external communities, with only the flashing onto the phone done by Pine64 directly. Because these community OS projects were involved in the development of the PinePhone, it has been ported to 19 Linux distributions and seven graphical user interfaces, as of August 2021, such as Ubuntu Touch by UBports, postmarketOS, Mobian (Debian ARM), LuneOS, Nemo Mobile and Maemo Leste.

An unofficial porting project, GloDroid, has ported Android 11 to the PinePhone.

Reception 
In August 2020, AndroidPolice reviewed the first Community edition, and beside the title "The Linux-based PinePhone is the most interesting smartphone I've tried in years" it touted the number of available distros, and the idea behind communities being provided with the means of developing their OS.

In January 2020, ZDNet called the PinePhone hardware "promising" and noted the hardware switches.

In December 2019, Martins D. Okoi of FossMint said that the first edition of the PinePhone is aimed at Linux-savvy users who would like to test beta operating system builds, but the version for general users should be available in March 2020.

In November 2019, Phillip Prado of Android Authority said that the PinePhone had the potential to "expand our imaginations into what mobile computing could look like", but he was not expecting it to replace everyone's Android device. Ars Technica wrote about the unusual external ports of the phone, offering I2C, GPIO and serial.

See also 

 List of open-source mobile phones
 Comparison of open-source mobile phones
 PinePhone Pro
 Librem 5

References

External links 

 
 PinePhone Wiki

Mobile Linux
Linux-based devices
Open-source mobile phones
Mobile phones introduced in 2020
Mobile/desktop convergence
Ubuntu Touch devices
Mobile phones with user-replaceable battery